Vittoria  is an Italian female given name taken from the female name Victoria and the male name Victor.

People with the given name Vittoria include:
 Vittoria Aganoor (1855–1910), Italian poet with Armenian ancestry
 Vittoria Aleotti (after 1620), Italian Augustinian nun, a composer and organist
 Vittoria Archilei, Italian singer, dancer, and lutenist
 Vittoria Belvedere (born 1972), Italian actress from Vibo Valentia in Calabria
 Vittoria Bentivoglio, singer in the 16th century Ferrarese court of Alfonso II d'Este
 Vittoria Ceretti (born 1998), Italian supermodel 
 Vittoria Colonna (1492–1547), Italian noblewoman and poet
 Vittoria Cremers (born 1859), Italian Theosophist
 Vittoria della Rovere (1622–1694), Grand Duchess of Tuscany as the wife of Grand Duke Ferdinando II
 Vittoria Farnese (1618–1649), Italian noblewoman
 Vittoria Puccini (born 1979), Italian film and television actress
 Vittoria Risi (born 1978), Italian pornographic actress and television personality
 Vittoria Tesi (1701–1775), Italian opera singer

Italian feminine given names